Sing Street (Original Motion Picture Soundtrack) is the soundtrack album to the 2016 film Sing Street, released on 11 March 2016 by Decca Records. The album featured original songs from artists, such as The Cure, a-ha, Duran Duran, The Clash, Hall & Oates, Spandau Ballet, The Blades and The Jam, representing the Irish music culture from the 1980s. It also featured few original songs performed by the fictional Sing Street band, composed by Danny Wilson frontman Gary Clark, while John Carney, Ken and Carl Papenfus of the band Relish, Graham Henderson and Zamo Riffman, also share the composing credits. An original song, "Go Now" by Adam Levine was released as a single, with a music video accompanying its release on 9 April 2016. It was released on physical CDs on 15 April 2016 and a vinyl edition released on 3 June 2016. The soundtrack received critical acclaim as well as numerous accolades.

Reception 
The music received critical acclaim. Michael Roffman of Consequence Of Sound gave an A- score to the album and said, "if you’ve made it this far, you’re already getting up to flip the damn thing over and start again. That was the power of Once and that’s the overwhelming mastery of Sing Street. Nearly a decade later, Carney has carved out another must-have soundtrack chock-full of favorites that will fluctuate upon every listen." Marcy Donelson of AllMusic wrote: "Sing Street features a soundtrack of MTV favorites from the era mixed with faux '80s originals by the fictional Sing Street band. The new songs were written by a team led by Carney and songwriter/film composer Gary Clark. Licensed songs include hits from the Cure, the Jam, Duran Duran, Joe Jackson, and more, for nearly an hour of new wave goodness." Allie Funk of Bustle "With so many ways to enjoy the soundtrack, a musical trip back to the '80s is a cinch. So pull out your best punk gear, indulge in some heavy eyeliner and teased hair, and rock out to songs old and new on the Sing Street soundtrack." Avant Music Port wrote that the compositions "are perfectly-pitched, sounding at once like original ’80s lost hits and also aurally echoing Conor’s exploration of music discovered on Top Of The Pops."

Track listing

Accolades

References 

2016 soundtrack albums
Pop soundtracks
Rock soundtracks
New wave soundtracks
Post-punk albums
Punk rock soundtracks
Alternative rock soundtracks
Indie rock soundtracks
College rock soundtracks
Decca Records soundtracks